Glutathione S-transferase omega-2 is an enzyme that in humans is encoded by the GSTO2 gene.

Model organisms 

Model organisms have been used in the study of GSTO2 function. A conditional knockout mouse line called Gsto2tm2a(KOMP)Wtsi was generated at the Wellcome Trust Sanger Institute. Male and female animals underwent a standardized phenotypic screen to determine the effects of deletion. Additional screens performed:  - In-depth immunological phenotyping

References

Further reading